Lakeland Union High School (LUHS) is a high school located in Minocqua, Wisconsin.

Academics
LUHS offers Honors and Advanced Placement (AP) courses.

Extracurricular activities

Athletics
Lakeland Union High School offers 25 sports:

Fall
Dance/Cheer
Cross country
Football
Boys' soccer
Girls' swimming
Girls' tennis
Volleyball

Winter
Dance/Cheer
Basketball
Gymnastics
Boys Hockey
Girls Hockey
Boys' swimming
Wrestling
Nordic skiing

Spring
Boys' baseball
Golf
Girls' soccer
Girls' softball
Boys' tennis
Track and field

References

External links
Lakeland Union High School website

Public high schools in Wisconsin
Schools in Oneida County, Wisconsin
School districts established in 1957
1957 establishments in Wisconsin